Tyler Shattock (born February 10, 1990) is a former Canadian professional ice hockey player. He last played for the Braehead Clan of the Elite Ice Hockey League in the United Kingdom. He was selected by the St. Louis Blues in the 4th round (108th overall) of the 2009 NHL Entry Draft.

Playing career
Prior to turning professional, Shattock played major junior hockey in the Western Hockey League for the Kamloops Blazers and Calgary Hitmen. On May 13, 2010, Shattock was signed by the St. Louis Blues to a three-year entry-level contract.  Shattock spent his tenure with the Blues playing for their AHL affiliate, first the Peoria Rivermen and then the Chicago Wolves.  Following the 2013-14 season, the Blues did not tender a qualifying offer to Shattock and on July 1, 2014, he became an unrestricted free agent.

On September 8, 2014, the Stockton Thunder of the ECHL announced they had signed Shattock. In the 2014–15 season, Shattock broke out offensively with the Thunder to enjoy his most successful season with 63 points from 65 games. He was loaned to the Worcester Sharks of the AHL for 3 games.

On September 22, 2015, with the Thunder relocating, Shattock signed as a free agent to remain in the ECHL with the Kalamazoo Wings. During the 2016–17 season, his second as Captain with the Wings and having contributed with 23 points in 37 games, Shattock was traded by Kalamazoo to the Alaska Aces in exchange for Justin Breton on January 17, 2017.

On 21 August 2017, Shattock moved to Scotland to sign for EIHL side, Braehead Clan.

Career statistics

References

External links

1990 births
Alaska Aces (ECHL) players
Braehead Clan players
Calgary Hitmen players
Canadian ice hockey right wingers
Chicago Wolves players
Evansville IceMen players
Kalamazoo Wings (ECHL) players
Kamloops Blazers players
Living people
Peoria Rivermen (AHL) players
St. Louis Blues draft picks
Stockton Thunder players
Worcester Sharks players
Canadian expatriate ice hockey players in the United States
Canadian expatriate ice hockey players in Scotland